Hinojosa de Jarque is a municipality located in the province of Teruel, Aragon, Spain. According to the 2004 census (INE), the municipality has a population of 158 inhabitants.

References 

Municipalities in the Province of Teruel